Timothy Cullen (born February 25, 1944) is an American politician and former Majority Leader of the Wisconsin Senate. He represented the Janesville-based 15th District between 2011 and 2015, and previously from 1975 through 1987.

Early life, education and career
Born in Janesville, Wisconsin, Cullen graduated from Janesville High School and from the University of Wisconsin–Whitewater. He was elected to the Janesville City Council. He is a former member of the Board of Education of the Janesville Public School District.

Wisconsin Senate first term 
Cullen was first elected to represent the 15th district in the Wisconsin Senate in 1974, defeating incumbent Republican James D. Swan with 18,931 votes to 14,982 for Swan. He would serve in that position until 1987. He was Majority Leader 1981, 1983 and 1985.

After the Senate 
In 1987 he was appointed by Republican Governor Tommy Thompson to head the Wisconsin Department of Health and Family Services; he was succeeded by Timothy Weeden. In 1988, he resigned from DHFS to become a vice-president for Blue Cross Blue Shield of Wisconsin.

Wisconsin Senate second term 
On November 2, 2010, Cullen was again elected to represent the 15th district, succeeding Judy Robson. In September 2013, Cullen announced he would be retiring from the state senate. One of the factors he cited as a reason for his retirement was the increased partisanship within the legislature.

2011 Wisconsin protests 

During the protests in Wisconsin, Cullen, along with the 13 other Democratic State Senators, fled the state to deny the State Senate a quorum on Governor Scott Walker's controversial "Budget Repair" legislation. Walker earlier referred to Cullen as "the only reasonable one" of the Wisconsin Democrats during the protests.

Governor's race in 2012 
Cullen had initially announced that if the recall petition drive against Scott Walker was successful, he would run for the Democratic primary election to oppose Walker. Cullen later withdrew, stating that he was unable to find sufficient funding to compete with other Democrats "who are far better known than I am, have access to financial resources above what I can raise, and have better statewide networks".

Governor's race in 2018 
Cullen indicated that he would be ready to announce a campaign to unseat Wisconsin Governor Scott Walker sometime in April 2017.
However, on March 29, he announced that he would not run, citing an inability to gain the necessary funds to run an effective campaign. In April 2018, Cullen was elected to serve as the Chair of the State Governing Board of Common Cause in Wisconsin, the state's largest non-partisan political reform advocacy organization. He stepped down as Chair in September 2022 but remains a board member.

References

External links
Senator Timothy Cullen at the Wisconsin State Legislature 
 
15th Senate District, Senator Cullen in the Wisconsin Blue Book (1985–1986)

Politicians from Janesville, Wisconsin
Businesspeople from Wisconsin
University of Wisconsin–Whitewater alumni
School board members in Wisconsin
Wisconsin city council members
Democratic Party Wisconsin state senators
1944 births
Living people
21st-century American politicians